John Ryan (born 20 January 2004) is an Irish professional footballer currently playing as a left-back for Sassuolo.

Club career
Born in County Limerick, Ryan started his career with local side Aisling Annacotty before a move to St. Kevin's Boys in 2017. He would not stay for long, and after an approach by Shamrock Rovers, he joined the Tallaght-based side in 2018. As a child, he also played Gaelic football for teams in Ballybricken and Monaleen as well as for the Limerick primary schools Gaelic football team.

After starring for Shamrock Rovers' youth sides, winning a number of competitions, he left for fellow League of Ireland Premier Division side UCD to gain more first-team experience, before securing a move to Italian side Sassuolo in September 2022.

International career
Ryan has represented the Republic of Ireland at youth international level.

Career statistics

Club

Notes

References

2004 births
Living people
Association footballers from County Limerick
Republic of Ireland association footballers
Republic of Ireland youth international footballers
Association football defenders
League of Ireland players
St. Kevin's Boys F.C. players
Shamrock Rovers F.C. players
University College Dublin A.F.C. players
U.S. Sassuolo Calcio players
Republic of Ireland expatriate association footballers
Irish expatriate sportspeople in Italy
Expatriate footballers in Italy